Pendarvis Williams (born November 13, 1991) is an American basketball player for the Proger Chieti of the Italian Serie A2. He played college basketball for Norfolk State University, where in the 2012–13 season he was named an honorable mention All-American.

Early life and college career
Williams, a 6'6" guard from Philadelphia, committed to Norfolk State where as a sophomore, he scored 20 points in the Spartans' 86–84 upset of number 2 seed Missouri in the 2012 NCAA Tournament.  As a junior, after the loss of All-American Kyle O'Quinn, the Spartans were not expected to contend for the Mid-Eastern Athletic Conference championship.  But Williams stepped up his performance, averaging 14.3 points and 4.3 rebounds per game.  He led the Spartans to a 16–0 record and won conference Player of the Year honors.  At the end of the season, Williams was named HBCU Player of the Year and an AP honorable mention All-American.

Professional career
Following the close of his college career, Williams signed with Fortitudo Agrigento in Italy's second division. On July 13, 2015 he signed for Obiettivo Lavoro Bologna from the Serie A.

On October 31, 2016, Williams was acquired by the Maine Red Claws. On January 9, 2017, he was waived by Maine after 10 games. He spent the 2017-18 season with Fortitudo Agrigento of the Italian Serie A2. Williams signed with the German team BG Göttingen on July 2, 2018.

On August 6, 2019, he has signed with JA Vichy-Clermont Métropole Basket of the French Pro B.

On July 13, 2020, he has signed with Proger Chieti of the Italian Serie A2.

References

External links
Norfolk State bio

1991 births
Living people
American expatriate basketball people in Germany
American expatriate basketball people in Italy
American men's basketball players
Basketball players from Philadelphia
BG Göttingen players
Fortitudo Agrigento players
Hun School of Princeton alumni
Maine Red Claws players
Norfolk State Spartans men's basketball players
Point guards
Shooting guards
Virtus Bologna players